Tibor Mezőfi (March 18, 1926 in Rákospalota – August 10, 2000 in Budapest) was a Hungarian basketball player who competed in the 1948 Summer Olympics and in the 1952 Summer Olympics.

He was a member of the Hungarian team, which finished sixteenth in the 1948 tournament.

Four years later he was part of the Hungarian basketball team, which was eliminated after the group stage in the 1952 tournament. He played all six matches.

References

1926 births
2000 deaths
Hungarian men's basketball players
Olympic basketball players of Hungary
Basketball players at the 1948 Summer Olympics
Basketball players at the 1952 Summer Olympics
FIBA EuroBasket-winning players
Basketball players from Budapest